Anson Gilbert Rabinbach (born June 2, 1945) is a historian of modern Europe and the Philip and Beulah Rollins Professor of History, Emeritus at Princeton University. He is best known for his writings on labor, Nazi Germany, Austria, and European thought in the nineteenth and twentieth centuries. In 1973 he co-founded the journal New German Critique, which he continues to co-edit.

Early life 
Rabinbach was born in the West Bronx, New York City. His father was a Polish-Jewish communist revolutionary. Rabinbach received his B.A. from Hofstra University in 1967. He went on to earn a Ph.D. from the University of Wisconsin–Madison in 1973. His dissertation, supervised by George Mosse, was published in 1983 as The Crisis of Austrian Socialism: From Red Vienna to Civil War, 1927–1934.

Career
Rabinbach taught at Hampshire College in Amherst, Massachusetts and at the Cooper Union for the Advancement of Science and Art in New York City, where he was Professor of History and twice served as Acting Dean of Humanities and Social Sciences. From 1996 to 2019 he taught at Princeton University, where he is the Philip and Beulah Rollins Professor of History Emeritus.

In 2012 a special issue of New German Critique was dedicated to Rabinbach's work and legacy. In their introduction to the issue, David Bathrick and Andreas Huyssen note Rabinbach's "compelling... staging of texts and debates written by or involving public intellectuals that have arisen in moments of crisis, catastrophe, or apocalypse," including his seminal writings on Theodor W. Adorno, Hannah Arendt, Walter Benjamin, Ernst Bloch, Martin Heidegger, Max Horkheimer, Karl Jaspers, and Raphael Lemkin. In his 1997 book In the Shadow of Catastrophe: German Intellectuals between Apocalypse and Enlightenment, Rabinbach characterizes these authors' writings on Europe's cataclysmic twentieth century as "powerful philosophical attempts to translate that experience into a philosophical language whose legacy still exerts a powerful intellectual and sometimes even political influence today." For his notable 1976 article "The Aesthetics of Production in the Third Reich," Rabinbach interviewed the notorious former Nazi architect and armaments minister Albert Speer.

The historian Martin Jay has called Rabinbach's 1990 book The Human Motor: Energy, Fatigue, and the Origins of Modernity "a classic of cultural studies" that "revealed for the first time the importance of the late-19th-century European obsession with the laboring body and its vicissitudes." The German historian Norbert Frei has written that Rabinbach is "widely known beyond the confines of his field" for this work, which has been also translated into German (2001) and French (2005).

In 1987, for his research on Red Vienna, Rabinbach was awarded the Victor Adler State Prize of the Republic of Austria, the highest honor for the humanities in Austria. He is also the recipient of fellowships from the John Simon Guggenheim Memorial Foundation, the National Endowment for the Humanities, the Fulbright Program (as a visiting professor at Smolny College in St. Petersburg, Russia), and the American Academy in Berlin.

At Princeton, Rabinbach taught courses on twentieth-century Europe, European intellectual and cultural history, and European Fascism. From 1996 to 2008 he was director of Princeton University’s Program in European Cultural Studies. He has been a visiting professor at the University of Jena, the University of Bremen, Smolny College of Saint Petersburg State University, and the École des Hautes Études en Sciences Sociales.

Rabinbach has been described as a "New York intellectual." His popular writings and reviews have appeared in Dissent, The Nation, Times Literary Supplement, and The New York Times.

Personal life
He was previously married to the feminist psychoanalyst Jessica Benjamin, with whom he has two children. He lives in New York City.

Bibliography
Books
 
 
 
 
 
 

Edited books
 
 
 
 

Notable articles

References 

Intellectual historians
American male non-fiction writers
Hampshire College faculty
Cooper Union faculty
Princeton University faculty
Hofstra University alumni
University of Wisconsin–Madison alumni
Living people
1945 births